Maa Ayana Chanti Pilladu is a 2008 Indian Telugu-language romantic drama film directed by Raja Vannem Reddy. Sivaji and Meera Jasmine played the lead roles. The film was a remake of successful Tamil movie En Purushan Kuzhandhai Maathiri.

Plot
Bullabbayi (Sivaji) is fond of his sister-in-law Rajeswari (Meera Jasmine). He loves her so much and wanted to be flawless with good character. Though Rajeswari behaves that she is not interested in him, she really loves him. Bullabbayi has a property dispute with his stepbrother Veerababu (Subbaraju). In a bid to save a girl called Chintamani (Sangeeta) from being sold by a brothel owner (Anuradha) to Veerababu, Bullabbayi pays her money and takes Chintamani with him and keeps her in his outhouse. Bullabbayi tells her to leave the place the next day, but accidentally, seduces Chintamani, after an attack by Veerababu's men against him. Being an honest boy, Bullabbayi reveals everything to his father-in-law and urges him to stop the marriage, but the latter refuses to do so. Again, Bullabbayi innocently reveals the incident to Rajeswari as he doesn't want to cheat her that he was pious and flawless. Rajeswari attempts suicide and gets saved by Bullabbayi. However, Rajeswari refuses to share the marital life with Bullabbayi. A few days later, her father convinces her and appeals to honour his honesty. Being impressed with his innocence, Rajeswari allows him into the bedroom and they enjoy a good family life. As a result, Rajeswari turns pregnant, also Chintamani. How does Bullabbayi manage both his pregnant wives? Does Chintamani come into the life of Rajeswari? Does Rajeswari keep mum on learning Chintamani was also pregnant and Bullabbayi continued to pamper her? What happenes to the property dispute between Bullabbayi and Veerababu? How did Veerababu react against Bullabbayi? Answers to all these questions form part of the climax.

Cast
Sivaji - Bullabbayi
Meera Jasmine - Rajeswari
Sangeetha - Chintamani
Subbaraju - Suribabu
Venu Madhav
Chandra Mohan
Annapurna
Satyam Rajesh

Soundtrack 
Music by M. M. Srilekha.

"Modatasari Muddupeditye" - Srikrishna, Ganga
"Yemandoye Srivaru" - Vijay Yesudas, M. M. Srilekha
"Yemi Sethura Linga" - Santha Kumari
"Adugu Adugu" - Geetha Madhuri, Jeans Srinivas
"Bavalu Sayya Sy" - Radhika, M. M. Srilekha

Reception

References

2008 films
2000s Telugu-language films
Telugu remakes of Tamil films
Indian comedy-drama films
2008 comedy-drama films
Films scored by M. M. Srilekha